The BMW S14 is a DOHC four-cylinder petrol engine which was used in the E30 M3, E30 320iS, and E36 320i Super Touring. It is based on the BMW M10 block and the cylinder head from the six-cylinder BMW S38 with two cylinders removed. The direct successor to the S14 was the S42 based on the M42 engine. The S42 was a racing engine installed in the E36 320i for the German Super Tourenwagen Cup. There is no direct successor to the S14 for production BMWs, since the following generation of M3 is powered by the BMW S50 six-cylinder engine.

Two separate throttle bodies are used, each incorporating two throttle butterfly plates.

Versions

S14B20
This version was only sold in Portugal and Italy.

Applications:
 1987-1990 E30 320iS (Italy and Portugal only)

S14B23
The E30 M3 was initially released with the  S14B23 engine. Versions equipped with a catalytic converter produced  and 230 Nm. In April 1989, the Ravaglia and Cecotto limited edition M3s were released with a  S14B23 that would in September, 1989 become the standard motor for the E30 M3.

Applications:
 1986-1991 E30 M3

S14B23 EVO2
This update of the S14B23 produced , or  if equipped with a catalytic converter.

Applications:
 1988-1990 E30 M3

S14B25 EVO3

Applications:
 1989-1990 E30 M3

See also 

 BMW
 List of BMW engines

References

S14
Straight-four engines
Gasoline engines by model